Uday Maitra is an Indian organic chemist and a professor in the department of organic chemistry at the Indian Institute of Science. He is known for his studies on molecular tools and supramolecular assemblies. He is a recipient of the Shanti Swarup Bhatnagar Prize for Science and Technology, one of the highest Indian science awards.

Biography 
Born in Durgapur, Maitra secured B.Sc. in Chemistry from Presidency College(then affiliated to University of Calcutta) and PhD in 1986 from Columbia University, working under the guidance of Ronald Breslow and did his post-doctoral studies at the laboratory of Paul A. Bartlett of the University of California, Berkeley. His studies are characterized by the new methodologies he employed  in developing supramolecular assemblies and molecular tools like receptors, tweezers and gelators. He has published his researches in a number of peer-reviewed articles; ResearchGate, an online repository of scientific articles has listed 142 of them. He has mentored many doctoral scholars and is involved in initiatives for the popularization of chemistry. He has participated in seminars to deliver plenary/invited addresses, was a member of the Indian delegation at the Indo-German Symposium on Frontiers of Chemistry organized by the Indian Institute of Technology, Kanpur and is a member of the editorial board of the Asian Journal of Organic Chemistry. The Council of Scientific and Industrial Research, the apex agency of the Government of India for scientific research, awarded him the Shanti Swarup Bhatnagar Prize for Science and Technology, one of the highest Indian science awards, in 2001, for his contributions to chemical sciences.

See also 
 Ronald Breslow

References 

Recipients of the Shanti Swarup Bhatnagar Award in Chemical Science
Indian scientific authors
Scientists from Bangalore
Fellows of the Indian Academy of Sciences
20th-century Indian chemists
Academic staff of the Indian Institute of Science
Indian theoretical chemists
Indian computational chemists
Columbia University alumni
University of California, Berkeley alumni
Living people
Year of birth missing (living people)
People from Durgapur, West Bengal
Scientists from West Bengal